Stemonuraceae is a eudicot family of flowering plants.

Genera
This listing was sourced from the Angiosperm Phylogeny Website and Royal Botanic Gardens, Kew
 Cantleya 
 Codiocarpus 
 Discophora 
 Gastrolepis 
 Gomphandra 
 Grisollea 
 Hartleya 
 Irvingbaileya 
 syn.: Kummeria  = Discophora 
 Lasianthera 
 Medusanthera 
 Stemonurus 
 syn.: Tylecarpus  = Medusanthera 
 syn.: Urandra  = Stemonurus 
 Whitmorea

References

 
Asterid families